Pelosia stictigramma is a moth of the  family Erebidae. It is found on Mayotte.

References
Citations

Bibliography
 Natural History Museum Lepidoptera generic names catalog

Lithosiina
Moths described in 1908